Acanthofrontia anacantha is a moth of the subfamily Arctiinae. It was described by George Hampson in 1914. It is found in Nigeria.

References

Endemic fauna of Nigeria
Moths described in 1914
Erebid moths of Africa